North Palm Springs is an unincorporated community in Riverside County, California, United States. North Palm Springs is located at the intersection of Dillon Road and North Indian Canyon Drive near the northern border of Palm Springs, south of Interstate 10.

In the 1950s and early 1960s, North Palm Springs hosted several businesses including a shoe repair shop, coin laundry, two bars that served burgers and other basic fare (one of which is still open under a new name), a Chinese restaurant, and a gas station that was connected to a restaurant and bar. There was one very small general store-type market. The nearest elementary school was in Desert Hot Springs (K-6), and junior high and high schools were in Palm Springs. 

An estimated 2,000 residents lived in North Palm Springs in the 2010 Census. 

Historically, it was the base of the Mission Creek Band of Cahuilla with a former Indian Reservation located northwest of the town.

References

Unincorporated communities in Riverside County, California
Unincorporated communities in California